Leon D. "Doug" Gilliam (born November 22, 1964) is an American politician. He is a member of the South Carolina House of Representatives from the 42nd District, serving since 2018. He is a member of the Republican party.
During a House debate on South Carolina's abortion bill, Gilliam argued that a raped 12-year-old girl could "take an ambulance" to obtain plan B.

References

Living people
1964 births
Republican Party members of the South Carolina House of Representatives
21st-century American politicians